Riadh Jelassi (born 7 July 1971 in Tebourba) is a Tunisian former professional footballer who played as a striker.

He was a member of the Tunisian national team at the World Cups in 1998 and 2002, although he only appeared as a substitute in Tunisia's last 1998 World Cup match against Romania, already eliminated. He scored 5 goals in 20 appearances for Tunisia.

International goals

External links
 

1971 births
Living people
Tunisian footballers
Tunisia international footballers
Tunisian expatriate footballers
Association football forwards
1998 FIFA World Cup players
2002 FIFA World Cup players
1998 African Cup of Nations players
Tunisian Ligue Professionnelle 1 players
Saudi Professional League players
Étoile Sportive du Sahel players
Al-Shabab FC (Riyadh) players
Espérance Sportive de Tunis players
Expatriate footballers in Saudi Arabia
Tunisian expatriate sportspeople in Saudi Arabia